is a Japanese voice actor affiliated with Office Osawa. His roles include Hiroto Kuga in Gundam Build Divers Re:Rise, Deuce Spade in Disney: Twisted-Wonderland, Makoto Edamura in Great Pretender, Langa Hasegawa in SK8 the Infinity,  Gabimaru in Hell's Paradise: Jigokuraku and Mash Burnedead in Mashle.

Filmography

Television animation

Original video animation (OVA)

Original net animation (ONA)

Theatrical animation

Video games
2018

 Sword Art Online: Fatal Bullet as Voice 9 (Male)
2019
 Crash Fever as Beethoven
 DANKIRA!!! - Boys, be DANCING! as Atago Rentaro
 Dragalia Lost as Shion
 Fate/Grand Order as Bartholomew Roberts
 MapleStory 2 as Thief
 SD Gundam G Generation Cross Rays as Soldier
 Yo-kai Watch: Wibble Wobble as Ryūsuke Kyūbi / Nine Tail 

2020
 Disney: Twisted-Wonderland as Deuce Spade
 Fantasy Life Online as Nine Tail 
 MapleStory as Carlisle
 World Flipper as Yakumo
 Yo-kai Watch Jam: Yo-kai Academy Y – Waiwai Gakuen Seikatsu as Ryūsuke Kyūbi / Nine Tail 
 Yu-Gi-Oh! Duel Links as Aigami

2021
 A3! as Akashi Serizawa
 Border Reign as Ganshu, Goya
 Bungo and Alchemist as Arthur Rimbaud
 Cookie Run: Kingdom as Sparkling Cookie
 Dragon Quest X Online as Guruyan Rush, Quad
 Fire Emblem Heroes as Ronan
 For Whom the Alchemist Exists as Nimuru
 Granblue Fantasy as New King of Levin
 Illusion Connect as Jason
 Show by Rock!! Fes A Live as 13

2022
 River City Girls 2 as Riki
 Honkai Impact 3rd as Kosma

Dubbing

Live-action
After as Hardin Scott (Hero Fiennes Tiffin)
Seo Bok as Seo Bok (Park Bo-gum)
Tales of the City as Jake Rodriguez (Garcia)

Animation
The Boss Baby: Back in Business as Wagby
Heaven Official's Blessing as Fu Yao
Mune: Guardian of the Moon as Leeyoon

Media mix

Accolades

References

External links
  
 

1994 births
Living people
21st-century Japanese male actors
Japanese male video game actors
Japanese male voice actors
Male voice actors from Kanagawa Prefecture
Seiyu Award winners